David Blaine McGregor (7 February 1909 – 1990) was a British water polo player who competed in the 1936 Summer Olympics. He was part of the British team which finished eighth in the 1936 tournament. He played three matches. He was also captain of the Scotland national team.

His son, Bob McGregor, competed as a swimmer at the 1964 and 1968 Summer Olympics, winning a silver medal in the 100 metres freestyle event in 1964.

References

External links
 
David McGregor's profile at the UK Olympic Committee
David McGregor's profile at Sports Reference.com

1909 births
1990 deaths
British male water polo players
Olympic water polo players of Great Britain
Water polo players at the 1936 Summer Olympics